José Carrera-García (born 20 July 1995) is a Mexican professional footballer who plays as a midfielder for  Central Valley Fuego in USL League One.

Career
Carrera-García signed with Chattanooga Red Wolves in November 2020.

On December 21, 2022, Carrera-Garcia moved to Central Valley Fuego.

Career statistics

Club

Notes

References

External links
José Carrera García at the University of California, Berkeley

1995 births
Living people
Mexican expatriate footballers
Association football midfielders
California Golden Bears men's soccer players
FC Golden State Force players
Club Celaya footballers
USL League Two players
Ascenso MX players
Expatriate soccer players in the United States
Mexican expatriate sportspeople in the United States
Footballers from Puebla
Las Vegas Lights FC players
Soccer players from California
Chattanooga Red Wolves SC players
Central Valley Fuego FC players
People from Ontario, California
Sportspeople from San Bernardino County, California
Mexican footballers